The OAAA OBIE Awards is an awards program managed by the Out of Home Advertising Association of America recognizing creativity in the out-of-home advertising (OOH) industry. The name OBIE is derived from the ancient Egyptian obelisk meaning, a tall stone structure used to publicize laws and treaties thousands of years ago. Many historians consider the obelisk as the first true form of advertising.

Eligibility
For an advertisement to be eligible for the OBIE Awards, the advertiser (or its agency) must have made payment for the unit space directly to an out of home media company owning or operating the structure, the only exception being public service advertisements.
 
The advertisement must have been posted within the previous calendar year. Identical advertisements posted during the eligible calendar year but entered in any previous OBIE Awards cycle are not eligible.

Current categories
Automotive
Consumer Goods & Services
Contextual OOH
Custom Installation
Craft
Engagement
Entertainment
Experiential
Food & Beverage
Integrated Media
International
Media
Non-Profits & Public Service
Retail
Transportation

Judging
Each year, a panel of seven judges meets to judge that year's OBIE Awards. The judges are selected from the top executives at advertising agencies and OOH media companies across the country. The OBIE jury gathers to evaluate all the entries in a day-long process that eventually yields Gold OBIE winners, Silver OBIE winners, and OBIE Finalists.

Ceremonies
2003 – Washington, DC
2004 – Scottsdale, Arizona
2005 – Chicago, Illinois 
2006 – Palm Springs, California
2007 – San Diego, California
2008 – Boca Raton, Florida
2010 – Phoenix, Arizona
2011 - Miami, Florida 
2012 – Miami, Florida
2013 – Los Angeles, California
2014 – Orlando, Florida
2015 - San Diego, California
2016 - Boca Raton, Florida
2017 - New Orleans, Louisiana
2018 - Austin, Texas
2019 - Las Vegas, Nevada
2020 - Phoenix, Arizona

Hall of Fame
The OBIE Hall of Fame Award was established in 1992 to reward brands that have exemplified long-standing distinction in using the OOH medium. The award is voted on by the OAAA membership each year. The first recipient of the OBIE Hall of Fame Award was the US Army. Past winners include Apple, Budweiser, Chick-fil-A, Coca-Cola and Mini Cooper.
2003 – McDonald's
2004 – Bank of America
2005 – Apple Computer
2006 – Chick-fil-A
2007 – Walt Disney Company
2008 – Altoids
2009 – Absolut
2010 – Mini Cooper
2011 – Cracker Barrel Old Country Store
2012 – Maker's Mark
2013 – ESPN
2014 - Gap Inc.
2015 - HBO
2016 - Corona (beer)
2017 - Warner Bros. Entertainment
2018 - Miller Coors
2019 - Universal Studios

References

Advertising awards
American awards